Group 2 consisted of five of the 50 teams entered into the European zone: England, Georgia, Italy, Moldova, and Poland. These five teams competed on a home-and-away basis for two of the 15 spots in the final tournament allocated to the European zone, with the group's winner and runner-up claiming those spots.

Standings

Results

Goal scorers

5 goals
 Alan Shearer

3 goals

 Teddy Sheringham
 Fabrizio Ravanelli
 Andrzej Juskowiak

2 goals

 Paul Gascoigne
 Ian Wright
 Shota Arveladze
 Temuri Ketsbaia
 Paolo Maldini
 Gianfranco Zola

1 goal

 Nick Barmby
 Les Ferdinand
 Paul Scholes
 Archil Arveladze
 Georgi Kinkladze
 Kakhaber Tskhadadze
 Roberto Baggio
 Pierluigi Casiraghi
 Roberto Di Matteo
 Christian Vieri
 Serghei Cleşcenco
 Alexandru Curtianu
 Henryk Bałuszyński
 Krzysztof Bukalski
 Marek Citko
 Adam Ledwoń
 Krzysztof Nowak
 Mirosław Trzeciak
 Krzysztof Warzycha

Notes

External links 
Group 2 Detailed Results at RSSSF

1
1996–97 in English football
1997–98 in English football
1996–97 in Georgian football
1997–98 in Georgian football
1996–97 in Italian football
1997–98 in Italian football
1996–97 in Moldovan football
1997–98 in Moldovan football
1996–97 in Polish football
1997–98 in Polish football